The Global Cities Dialogue on Information Society (GCD), is a non-profit international association of Mayors and High Political Representatives (HPRs) who believe that the development of the Information Society should be for the benefit of all the citizens, communities and peoples of the world. They committed themselves to become actively involved in creating equal opportunities and access for all citizens built on the principle of sustainable development.

History 
The GCD was launched on November 23, 1999 Helsinki City Hall by twelve founding members who decided to commit themselves to the development of the information society for the benefit of all regardless of race, social position, creed, gender or age. Their commitment started by signing the Declaration of Helsinki for a Global Cities Dialogue on the Information Society. 

Its current chairman is the mayor of Issy-les-Moulineaux (France), André Santini.

The initiative was born while the elected representative became aware that cities have a special place for the Information Society development. "It's the geographical, political, socioeconomic and cultural entities where millions of people live, work and directly exercise their rights as citizens and consumers. It's close to citizens and face the main questions, the changes and the opportunities of the information society, the local democracy to administrative departments" said Erkki Liikanen, the European commissioner who has sponsored the foundation of the network in 1999.

In 2000, the GCD's constitution was approved in Bremen, Germany. At the same year, the website was launched and the member-cities participated for the first time in the General Assembly Meeting in Sophia Antipolis, France.

In 2004, GCD started to develop its network in Asia and in Latin America. 

Since its creation, the GCD has been always active through different conferences and events about new technologies. It participated in the World Summit Of Cities And Local Authorities On The Information Society in Bilbao (2005), World e-Democracy Forum in Issy-les-Moulineaux (2006) and Lyon Conference For Digital Solidarity (2008). Currently there are over 200 cities participating in the program, many are allowed to participate without attending due to usage of online communication technology, such as skype.

Over the last decade it has invited nearly 200 cities across the five continents.

Organisation 
The GCD is composed by a chair city, a steering committee and the member cities. It's represented by the mayor or the HPR of the elected city. The appointed is elected for two years during the General Assembly Meeting (GAM).

Each city should name a representative, called Sherpa, in order to delegate it. Sherpas meet regularly in order to decide about several projects of GCD, the application of some projects or the organization of the GAM.

The General Assembly is composed of mayors or nominated HPR of the member cities. The meeting is organized once a year and its role is to oversee the overall policy and actions of GCD. 

GCD has three main projects currently :
 The reduction of the digital divide.
 The setting-up of the sustainable environmental technologies.
 The mobile technologies.

Innovations 
The GCD has always encouraged its members in the application of ICT for the benefits of their citizens.

The membership committed personally mayors of the member cities in order to improve the daily life of its citizens thanks to ICT. Examples include: 
 e-Book : Issy-les-Moulineaux (France) allows citizen to borrow e-books from its public libraries since January 2010.
 Mobile payment : It's now possible to pay bus ticket by sms in Antwerp (Belgium), Luxembourg and Helsinki (Finland). The system PaybyPhone has also been introduced in some cities as Issy-les-Moulineaux (France), Cologne (Germany) and Vilnius (Lithuania). Citizens can pay their parking by sms instead of the park machine.
 Wi-Fi zones : Some cities as Barcelona (Spain), Bologna (Italy), Metz (France) or Lyon (France) has covered its cities with the Wi-Fi access in order to facilitate the access to Internet.
 Information by sms : The city of Belo Horizonte (Brazil) has thought of a system called "Hello Citizen". Each resident can receive cultural or educative information by sms. In Boston (USA), citizens are allows to testify thanks to the system "Crimestoppers".
 Tourist information : It's available by phone in Bremen and Buenos Aires

Member Cities (1999–2009)

External links 
 Global Cities Dialogue 
 Additional support for the 1% digital solidarity principle 
 The position of local authorities (in French)
 Mobile services (in French) 
 GCD stressed the removal of digital divide 
 Framework proposal by Telecities

References

Digital divide
Information technology organizations